The 1976 British Hard Court Championships, also known by its sponsored name Coca-Cola British Hard Court Championships, was a combined men's and women's tennis tournament played on outdoor clay courts in Bournemouth, England. The men's event was part of the 1976 Commercial Union Assurance Grand Prix. The tournament was held from 10 May through 16 May 1976. Wojciech Fibak and Helga Masthoff won the singles titles.

Finals

Men's singles
 Wojciech Fibak defeated  Manuel Orantes 6–2, 7–9, 6–2, 6–2

Women's singles
 Helga Masthoff defeated  Sue Barker 5–7, 6–3, 6–3

Men's doubles
 Wojciech Fibak /  Fred McNair defeated  Juan Gisbert, Sr. /  Manuel Orantes 4–6, 7–5, 7–5

Women's doubles
 Linky Boshoff /  Ilana Kloss defeated  Lesley Charles /  Sue Mappin 6–3, 6–2

Mixed doubles
 Linky Boshoff /  Colin Dowdeswell defeated  Ilana Kloss /  Byron Bertram 6–8, 8–6, 6–1

References

External links
 ITF tournament edition details

British Hard Court Championships
British Hard Court Championships
British Hard Court Championships
British Hard Court Championships